Wilson Martínez (born July 28, 1986) is a Dominican former footballer who played in the Liga Dominicana de Fútbol, and the Canadian Soccer League.

Career 
Martínez began his career in 2012 with Moca FC in the Liga Dominicana de Fútbol, where he won the league title in his debut season. In 2013, he went overseas to Canada to play with the York Region Shooters in the Canadian Soccer League. During his tenure with York Region he achieved an undefeated season in 2014, where he won the CSL Championship. In 2015, he returned to the Dominican and signed with Atlántico FC.

International career 
He made his debut for the Dominican Republic national football team on February 28, 2008 against Haiti.

References 

1986 births
Living people
Dominican Republic footballers
Dominican Republic international footballers
York Region Shooters players
Canadian Soccer League (1998–present) players
Association football defenders
Liga Dominicana de Fútbol players